1905 was the 16th season of County Championship cricket in England. England defeated Australia 2–0 in the Test series and Yorkshire pipped defending champions Lancashire for the championship title.

Honours
County Championship - Yorkshire
Minor Counties Championship - Norfolk
Wisden - David Denton, Walter Lees, George Thompson, Joe Vine, Levi Wright

County Championship

Yorkshire and Lancashire fought throughout the season; Lancashire were the first team to beat Yorkshire, in their ninth game, when hundreds from Reggie Spooner and Johnny Tyldesley helped Lancashire to an innings victory at Old Trafford. Lancashire went unbeaten until July, their fifteenth game, when Surrey overcame them at Aigburth, but Yorkshire were behind on the table with three losses before their match with Yorkshire at Bramall Lane. With Walter Brearley taking seven for 35 in the first innings, Lancashire took a lead of 101, but Wilfred Rhodes turned it around with 74 and four for 49. Lancashire could still have managed to take the title with wins in their final games, but a loss to Gloucestershire at Bristol while Yorkshire avoided defeat meant the title went to Yorkshire.

This season saw Northamptonshire join the Championship; they played twelve matches, beating Derbyshire and Hampshire to avoid the wooden spoon.

Final table 

The final County Championship table is shown below. One point was awarded for a win, none for a draw, and minus one for a loss. Positions were decided on percentage of points over completed games.

 1 Games completed

Most runs in the County Championship

Most wickets in the County Championship

Ashes tour

Australia toured England in 1905, playing 35 first class matches around the British Isles. They only lost three of them, beating both champions Yorkshire and runners-up Lancashire, but two of the lost matches were Tests, and they drew the other three to lose the series 0–2. England's captain, Stanley Jackson, not only won the series, but also won the toss in all five matches and headed both the batting and the bowling averages. Australia only took a first-innings lead in one of the matches, the first, and then Archie MacLaren responded with his highest career Test score of 140 before Bernard Bosanquet took eight for 107 and bowled England to a 213-run victory. The second Test only reached the third innings, with no play possible on the final day, while Australia survived 91 overs for the loss of seven wickets in the drawn third Test. In the fourth Test, however, they lost nine wickets for 51 on the final day, after being asked to follow on 249 behind. They lost by an innings and 80 runs, thus conceding an unassailable lead in the series before the final Test, where England made 430 and 261 for six declared to draw the game. The Australians' only other loss came at Leyton to Essex in June.

Overall first-class statistics

Leading batsmen

Leading bowlers

References

Annual reviews
 Wisden Cricketers' Almanack 1906

External links
 Cricket in England in 1905

1905 in English cricket
1905